Al-Habsi is an Omani surname. Notable people with the surname include:

 Ali Al-Habsi (born 1981), Omani footballer
 Juma Al-Habsi (born 1996), Omani footballer
 Mohammed Al-Habsi (born 1991), Omani swimmer
 Shinoona Salah Al-Habsi (born 1993), Omani runner

Arabic-language surnames